John David Love (17 April 1913 – 23 August 2002) was an American field geologist and specialist in Rocky Mountain geology who worked for the
United States Geological Survey (USGS) from 1942 to 1987. He was only the second person in American history to complete two separate geologic maps of an entire region as the senior author (Wyoming 1955 and Wyoming 1985) and was the first winner of the Legendary Geoscientist award from the American Geological Institute.

Early life
Love was born at his parents' ranch near Riverton, Wyoming. He earned his bachelor's and master's degrees from the University of Wyoming and received his Ph.D. in geology from Yale University in 1938. When Love was a doctoral student, his family doctor, Francis Smith, M.D. told him he'd met up again with the outlaw Butch Cassidy after Cassidy was supposed to have died in a shootout. The doctor said he had seen evidence of a bullet wound repair he did on the outlaw in the past.

Career
Love worked for Shell Oil Company from 1938 to 1942 and opened the USGS field office at Laramie in 1943, where he worked until the office closed in 1987.

Love played a key role in the start of the uranium-mining industry in Wyoming by discovering uranium in 1951 near Pumpkin Buttes, about 25 miles northeast of Midwest, Wyoming.

References

Further reading 
 Bartlett, Kristina. "In Memoriam: J. David Love", Geotimes, August 2002.
 

1913 births
2002 deaths
20th-century American geologists
People from Riverton, Wyoming
University of Wyoming alumni
Yale Graduate School of Arts and Sciences alumni
United States Geological Survey personnel